Kristan Cunningham is an American actress and interior designer living in Los Angeles, CA. She studied interior design at the University of Charleston.  Kristan was raised in Sylvester and is a graduate of Sherman High School in Seth West Virginia.

Kristan Cunningham is best known as a host of HGTV's Design on a Dime as well as her appearances on Rachael Ray.

External links 

Living people
American interior designers
American women interior designers
Year of birth missing (living people)
21st-century American women